Miriam Malone is a former camogie player, winner of the AIB Gaelic Star Junior Player of the Year award in 1987.

Career
Having played for Broadford since the formation of the camogie club and for Kildare county team since 1966, she scored 1-7 for Kildare in their breakthrough 1987 All Ireland Junior championship winning final against Armagh. She was selected on the Kildare camogie team of the century in 2004. She won Leinster junior championship medals in 1967, 1969, 1981, 1986 and 1987 and captained Kildare in their first, unsuccessful All Ireland final appearance in 1986. She won Gael Linn Cup medals at senior and junior level with Leinster.

References

External links
 Camogie.ie Official Camogie Association Website
 Wikipedia List of Camogie players

Living people
Year of birth missing (living people)
Kildare camogie players